Mademoiselle Gobete is a 1952 Italian comedy film directed by Pietro Germi.

Cast
 Silvana Pampanini: Gobette
 Aroldo Tieri: Judge Luciano Pinglet
 Carlo Dapporto:  Cipriano Gaudet
 Ave Ninchi: Aglae Tricoin
 Luigi Pavese: President Tricoin
 Marilyn Buferd: Angelina
 Paolo Stoppa
 Nico Pepe
 Laura Gore
 Ernesto Calindri
 Eva Vanicek

See also
Madame la Presidente (1916)
La presidentessa (1977)

External links
 

1952 films
1950s Italian-language films
1950s historical comedy films
Films set in France
Films set in the 19th century
Films directed by Pietro Germi
Italian films based on plays
Films scored by Carlo Rustichelli
Italian historical comedy films
1952 comedy films
Italian black-and-white films
1950s Italian films